
Gmina Zbąszyń is an urban-rural gmina (administrative district) in Nowy Tomyśl County, Greater Poland Voivodeship, in west-central Poland.

Villages
Apart from the town of Zbąszyń, Gmina Zbąszyń contains the villages and settlements of Chrośnica, Czerwony Dwór, Dąbrowa, Edmundowo, Ernestynowo, Kopce, Leśne Domki, Łomnica, Morgi, Nądnia, Nowa Wieś Zbąska, Nowa Wieś-Zamek, Nowe Czeskie, Nowe Jastrzębsko, Nowy Dwór, Nowy Świat, Perzyny, Piaski, Poświętne, Przychodzko, Przyprostynia, Stare Czeskie, Stefanowice, Stefanowo, Strzyżewo, Szklana Huta and Zakrzewko.

Neighbouring gminas
Gmina Zbąszyń is bordered by the gminas of Babimost, Miedzichowo, Nowy Tomyśl, Siedlec, Trzciel and Zbąszynek.

References

External links
Polish official population figures 2006

Zbaszyn
Nowy Tomyśl County